The  is a high-speed Shinkansen service operated by East Japan Railway Company (JR East) and Hokkaido Railway Company (JR Hokkaido) between Tokyo and  in Japan since 26 March 2016.

Service pattern
Hayabusa services stop at the following stations.

 
 *
 
 
 *
 *
 *
 *
 *
 *
 
 *
 *
 *
 *
 
 *
 *
 

(*) Not served by all trains

Most Hayabusa trains are coupled to an Akita Shinkansen Komachi train between Tokyo and Morioka.

The fastest service from Tokyo to Shin-Hakodate-Hokuto takes approximately 3 hours 57 minutes. Some Hayabusa services begin or end at Shin-Aomori Station.

Train formation
Hayabusa services are normally operated by 10-car E5 series or H5 series trainsets, with car 1 at the Tokyo end. All seats are reserved and no smoking is allowed.

Hayabusa trains feature premium GranClass accommodation with 2+1 leather seating and complimentary food and drinks, including alcohol.

History

Sleeping car service (1958–2009)

From 20 July 1960, the train was upgraded with 20 series sleeping cars, and extended to run to and from Nishi-Kagoshima (now ). From 9 March 1975, the train was upgraded with 24 series sleeping cars.

Dining car service was discontinued from March 1993.

From 1 March 2005, the Hayabusa was combined with the Fuji service between Tokyo and Moji, following the discontinuation of the Sakura service which previously operated in conjunction with the Hayabusa.

Finally, due to declining ridership, the Hayabusa, along with its counterpart service, the Fuji, was discontinued from the start of the revised timetable on 14 March 2009.

Shinkansen service (2011–)
From 5 March 2011, the Hayabusa name was revived for the new 300 km/h shinkansen services operated by JR East between Tokyo and  using new E5 series trainsets, and extended to Shin-Hakodate-Hokuto Station on 26 March 2016.

Rolling stock

Sleeping car service
In its final days, the limited express train was formed of 14 series sleeping cars based at JR Kyushu's Kumamoto Depot, typically consisting of six cars in the Hayabusa portion and six cars in the Fuji portion.

Locomotive types used
 EF60-500 (Tokyo - Shimonoseki, from 29 December 1963)
 EF65-500 (Tokyo - Shimonoseki, from 1 October 1965)
 EF65-1000 (Tokyo - Shimonoseki, from July 1978)
 EF66 (Tokyo - Shimonoseki, from 14 March 1985)

Shinkansen service

The new shinkansen Hayabusa services use 10-car E5 series sets, which initially operated at a maximum speed of 300 km/h between Utsunomiya and Morioka. The maximum speed was raised to 320 km/h from the start of the revised timetable on 16 March 2013. From the same date, some services run coupled to E6 series Super Komachi services between Tokyo and Morioka. These services were limited to a maximum speed of 300 km/h. Since 15 March 2014, the name of Super Komachi services was returned simply to Komachi, and the maximum speed has been raised to 320 km/h; from the same date, some Hayabusa services are operated by 10-car E5 series sets coupled to 7-car E6 series sets. At Morioka, the E5 series and E6 series sets decouple, with the E5 series set continuing along the Tohoku Shinkansen as the Hayabusa and the E6 series set turning onto the Akita Shinkansen as the Komachi.

From 26 March 2016, with the opening of the Hokkaido Shinkansen from Shin-Aomori to Shin-Hakodate-Hokuto, the Hayabusa name was used for services operating between Tokyo, Sendai, and Shin-Hakodate-Hokuto. From the start of the 26 March 2016 timetable revision, ten return services operate daily between Tokyo and Shin-Hakodate-Hokuto, and one return service daily operates between Sendai and Shin-Hakodate-Hokuto.

See also
 Blue Train (Japan)
 High-speed rail
 List of named passenger trains of Japan

References

External links

 Official JR East site for E5 series Hayabusa 

Kyushu Railway Company
East Japan Railway Company
Night trains of Japan
Railway services introduced in 1958
Railway services discontinued in 2009
Railway services introduced in 2011
Tōhoku Shinkansen
Hokkaido Shinkansen
Passenger trains running at least at 300 km/h in commercial operations
Named Shinkansen trains